Simón Cano Le Tiec (born in Málaga) is a film critic and journalist . He is known for his film review column in the Málaga Hoy, a Spanish daily newspaper, which he wrote weekly since 2012. He is, currently, the youngest film critic in Spain, who started to review films at the age of 15 for some local newspapers, as Torremolinos Informacion.

References

Year of birth missing (living people)
Spanish film critics
Living people